The 1956 Christchurch mayoral election was part of the New Zealand local elections held that same year. In 1956, election were held for the Mayor of Christchurch plus other local government positions. The polling was conducted using the standard first-past-the-post electoral method.

Background
Sitting mayor Robert Macfarlane was re-elected for a fourth term, opposed only by Bill MacGibbon of the Citizens' Association who had run against Macfarlane in 1950.

Mayoral results
The following table gives the election results:

Council results

References

Mayoral elections in Christchurch
1956 elections in New Zealand
Politics of Christchurch
November 1956 events in New Zealand
1950s in Christchurch